Following are the official winners of the national Brazilian Chess Championships from 1927 to date.

The 1998 championship was held 9–19 December in Itabirito, Minas Gerais State.
The field of sixteen played a series of two-game single-elimination matches to determine the finalists.
Rafael Leitão defeated Giovanni Vescovi in the four-game final match, winning the first game and drawing the remaining three.

Winners

| valign="top" |
{| class="sortable wikitable"
|+ Women's Winners
! # !! Year !! City !! Champion
|-
|       1       ||      1957    ||                      || 
|-
|       2       ||      1958    ||     São Paulo             || 
|-
|       3       ||      1959    ||                      || 
|-
|	4	||	1960	||	Brusque	|| 
|-
|       5       ||      1961    ||                      || 
|-
|       6       ||      1962    ||                      || 
|-
|       7       ||      1963    ||                      || 
|-
|	8	||	1965	||		||	
|-
|	9	||	1966	||	Belo Horizonte || 
|-
|	10	||	1967	||	São Paulo	||	
|-
|       11       ||     1968    ||                     São Bernardo do Campo	||	
|-
|       12       ||     1969    ||      Rio de Janeiro || 
|-
|	13	||	1970	||	         	|| 	
|-
|       14       ||     1971    ||      São Paulo   || 
|-
|	15	||	1972	||	Blumenau	||	
|-
|	16	||	1973	||	Guarapari	||		
|-
|	17	||	1975	||		||     
|-
|	18	||	1976	||	São Paulo	||	
|-
|	19	||	1977	||	Brasília	||	
|-
|	20	||	1978	||	Brasília	||	
|-
|	21	||	1979	||	Mogi Guaçu	||	
|-
|	22	||	1980	||	Laguna	||	
|-
|	23	||	1981	||	Laguna	||	
|-
|	24	||	1982	||	Mogi Guaçu	||	  Regina Lúcia Ribeiro
|-
|	25	||	1984	||	Peabiru	||	
|-
|	26	||	1985	||	Guarapari	||	
|-
|	27	||	1986	||	Garanhuns	||	
|-
|	28	||	1987	||	Canela	||	
|-
|	29	||	1988	||	Caiobá	||	
|-
|	30	||	1989	||	Maringá	||	
|-
|	31	||	1990	||	Rio de Janeiro	||	
|-
|	32	||	1991	||	Blumenau	||	
|-
|	33	||	1992	||	São Sebastião	||	
|-
|	34	||	1993	||	Brasília	||	
|-
|	35	||	1994	||	Brasília	||	
|-
|	36	||	1995	||	Brasília	||	
|-
|	37	||	1996	||	Florianópolis	||	
|-
|	38	||	1997	||	Itapirubá	||	
|-
|	39	||	1998	||	São Paulo	||	
|-
|	40	||	1999	||	Altinópolis	||	
|-
|	41	||	2000	||	Batatais	||	
|-
|	42	||	2001	||	Bariri	||	
|-
|	43	||	2002	||	Batatais	||	
|-
|	44	||	2003	||	Miguel Pereira	||	
|-
|	45	||	2004	||	Curitiba	||	
|-
|	46	||	2005	||	Jundiaí	||	
|-
|	47	||	2006	||	São Paulo	||	
|-
|	48	||	2007	||	Americana, São Paulo	||	
|-
|	49	||	2008	||	Novo Hamburgo	||	
|-
|	50	||	2009	||	Capão da Canoa	||	
|-
|	51	||	2010	||	Catanduva	||	
|-
|	52	||	2011	||	Balneário Camboriú	||	
|-
|	53	||	2012	||	São José do Rio Preto	|| 
|-
|	54	||	2013	||	São José do Rio Preto	|| 
|-
|	55	||	2014	||	Blumenau	|| 
|-
|       56      ||      2015    ||      São Paulo   || Juliana Sayumi Terao
|-
|       57      ||      2016    ||      Rio de Janeiro   || Juliana Sayumi Terao
|-
|       58      ||      2017    ||      Rio de Janeiro   || Juliana Sayumi Terao
|-
|       59       ||     2018    ||      Rio de Janeiro || Juliana Sayumi Terao
|-
|       60       ||     2019    ||      Rio de Janeiro || Juliana Sayumi Terao
|}
|-
|}

References

http://www.brasilbase.pro.br/
https://web.archive.org/web/20071010145931/http://www.hiperchess.com.br/galerias/Brasileiro.htm
https://web.archive.org/web/20071010145847/http://www.hiperchess.com.br/galerias/Brasileiro_Feminino.htm 
https://web.archive.org/web/20041217105328/http://www.wsc.jor.br/xadrez/feminino_br.htm
1995 Crosstable from chess.gr
2007 from TWIC

Chess national championships
Women's chess national championships
Championship
Chess